The Philadelphia TRACON/ATCT is located at the Philadelphia International Airport and is a TRACON (Terminal Radar Approach Control) with Up-and-Down capabilities which means it includes both a TRACON and ATCT (Air Traffic Control Tower) in the same facility.  The facility is "sectorized" into two sectors for the controllers.  "A-side" controllers,  work the tower, and half the radar room.  "B-side" controllers work the entire radar room (POM).

Philadelphia International Airport is a level 12 facility and the TRACON works on an average of 2,800 daily movements; the ATCT handles about 1,700 operations per day. 

The primary responsibility of the Philadelphia TRACON/ATCT is the safe, orderly, and expeditious flow of arrival, departure, and en route traffic. PHL TRACON's main responsibility is obviously Philadelphia International Airport.  Additionally, they offer approach and departure services to several other satellite airports near PHL; Northeast Philadelphia Airport (PNE), New Castle Airport (ILG) in Wilmington, Delaware, Trenton Mercer Airport (TTN) in Trenton, New Jersey and several smaller General Aviation fields such as Wings Field (LOM) in Blue Bell, Pennsylvania, Heritage Field Airport (PTW) in Pottstown, PA and Brandywine Airport (OQN) in West Chester, Pennsylvania. The TRACON's airspace overlies a total of four states including New Jersey, Delaware, Pennsylvania, and extreme north east Maryland.

PHL Air Traffic Levels

With 499,653 total flight movements in 2008, Philadelphia International Airport ranks 11th in world in terms of aircraft movement.  As recently as 2006, the airport ranked 9th in terms of aircraft movement, but was passed in 2007 by Paris' Charles de Gaulle International Airport and by Charlotte/Douglas International Airport. It does not rank in the top 30 rankings for either passenger or cargo movement. In 2008 the airport handled a total of 31.8 million passengers, which for passenger movement would rank it several places behind Charlotte (#30), which handled 33.1 million passengers in 2008. The world's busiest airport in terms of passenger movement in 2008 was Atlanta's Hartsfield-Jackson International Airport with 90,039,280 passengers, nearly three times the passengers that passed through Philadelphia International Airport the same year. Statistics on passenger origination and termination (with PHL airport as an originating or final destination) are not widely available.

TRACON Breakdown

 Final Vectors One - 125.4
 Final Vectors Two - 132.675
 North Arrival - 128.4
 South Arrival - 133.87
 North Departure - 124.35
 South Departure - 119.75
 North High - 126.075
 South High - 125.125
 Yardley - 123.8
 Pottstown  - 126.85
 Dupont - 118.35
 Woodstown - 127.35

ATCT Breakdown

 Local East - 118.5
 Local West - 135.1
 Ground East - 121.9
 Ground West - 121.65
 Clearance Delivery - 118.85
 Tower Sequencer (During SWAP)- 123.6

Neighboring Facilities

PHL is bordered by the following facilities:

 New York TRACON (N90)
 Potomac TRACON (PCT)
 Reading TRACON (RDG)
 McGuire RAPCON (WRI)
 Allentown TRACON (ABE)
 Dover RAPCON (DOV)
 Harrisburg TRACON (MDT)
 Atlantic City TRACON (ACY)

PHL airspace lies beneath both of the following ARTCCs:

 New York ARTCC  (ZNY)
 Washington ARTCC  (ZDC)

References

Air traffic control in the United States
Aviation in Pennsylvania
Philadelphia International Airport